"Get the Devil Out of Me" is a song that was released on the Delain album We Are the Others. The single has been available for purchase online as of 13 April 2012.<ref></</ref> Vinyl versions of the single were also given out to fans at the release party for the band's third album, We Are the Others, with the purchase of the album.

Music video
The music video for "Get the Devil Out of Me'" was revealed on 20 April 2012. The video features footage from the recording sessions for the new album and live material, including footage from the UK Sonisphere Festival in 2010 used with the permission of BlinkTV.<ref></</ref>

References

2012 singles
Songs written by Martijn Westerholt
Songs written by Charlotte Wessels
Delain songs
2011 songs